Francis Gilles Poullain-Patterson (born 15 April 1967), better known as Frankie Poullain, is the bass player for rock band The Darkness. He was raised in Milnathort then Edinburgh, Scotland. He attended the Royal High School, leaving in 1985.

Poullain was the only original Darkness member not from the Lowestoft area.

Poullain left the band on 23 May 2005, citing "musical differences" as the reason. He was replaced by Richie Edwards, a former guitar technician for the band. His departure caused quite a stir with the press, most notably in the NME magazine where he was reportedly regarded as their favourite member of the band.

However, in 2011 The Darkness officially announced that they were to reunite, with all 4 original members. Frankie described this as being "Just like old times". The band sub-headlined Download Festival at Donington Park, England in June 2011, playing under Def Leppard. They also played at Hammersmith, with Queen guitarist Brian May joining the band. The band's third studio album Hot Cakes was released in early 2012, as the band embarked on the Hot Cakes tour.

Frankie's autobiography Dancing in the Darkness (John Blake Publishing), charting the ups and downs of life with the band, was released in November 2008.

He is a step-brother of comedian Phil Kay.

Equipment
He plays a Gibson Thunderbird IV bass guitar (nicknamed "the brown bastard"), recognizable for its reverse body design. He received this from a man in Wales named "Ray" who was in a band called "The Pooh Sticks." When playing live he allows natural distortion to take place for effect. He also uses a Fender Precision Bass, Ampeg VT, Mesa Boogie, 50 watt hand-wired Marshall guitar combo and a Sans Amp bass driver.

References

External links
 FlamingWhopper.com, UK based fan website for The Darkness, Stone Gods, Hot Leg & British Whale (Established 2005)
 outofthedarkness.co.uk , Fan based media website for The Darkness, Stone Gods, Hot Leg and British Whale

1967 births
Living people
Scottish bass guitarists
The Darkness (band) members